Agberto Correa de Matos (born 8 April 1972) is a Brazilian male handball player. He was a member of the Brazil men's national handball team, playing as a left back. He was a part of the team at the 1996 Summer Olympics and 2004 Summer Olympics.  He was a member of São Bernardo do Campo from 2003 to 2006.

References

1972 births
Living people
Brazilian male handball players
Handball players at the 1996 Summer Olympics
Handball players at the 2004 Summer Olympics
Olympic handball players of Brazil
Sportspeople from Santos, São Paulo
Pan American Games medalists in handball
Pan American Games silver medalists for Brazil
Medalists at the 1995 Pan American Games
Competitors at the 1995 Pan American Games